The following is a timeline of the history of the city of Fort Lauderdale, Florida, USA.

19th century

 1893 - Fort Lauderdale trading post established in Dade County.
 1896 - Florida East Coast Railroad begins operating.
 1899 - Schoolhouse established.

20th century

 1901 - Stranahan house built.
 1910 - Population: 336.
 1911
 Fort Lauderdale incorporated.
 Fort Lauderdale Sentinel newspaper begins publication.
 Office of city marshall created.
 1912
 North New River Canal built.
 W.H. Marshall becomes mayor.
 1913 - Fire station built.
 1915 - Fort Lauderdale becomes seat of newly created Broward County.
 1917 - Las Olas Boulevard built.
 1919 - Filmmaker D.W. Griffith films The Idol Dancer and The Love Flower in Fort Lauderdale.
 1925 - Snow-Reed Swing Bridge and Grand Canal Arch Deck Bridge built.
 1926 - September 18: 1926 Miami hurricane occurs.
 1927 - Fort Lauderdale station built.
 1928
 County Courthouse built.
 Port Everglades opens.
 1930 - Population: 8,668.
 1935 - Hurricane occurs.
 1939 - Florida Theatre in business.
 1941 - Hugh Taylor Birch State Park established.
 1948
 Broward County International Airport opens.
 City Hall rebuilt.
 1950
 War Memorial Auditorium opens.
 Population: 36,328.
 1955 - WWIL radio begins broadcasting.
 1956 - Federal Drive-In cinema in business.
 1958
 Museum of Art opens.
 WFTL radio begins broadcasting.
 1959 - Broward Community College founded.
 1960
 New River Tunnel opens.
 Sun-Sentinel newspaper in publication.
 Davie Boulevard Bridge and SE 3rd Avenue Bridge built.
 Population: 83,648.
 1962
 Fort Lauderdale Stadium opens.
 Fort Lauderdale Historical Society and Fort Lauderdale Yankees baseball team formed.
 1963 - Fort Lauderdale High School built.
 1964
 Nova Southeastern University founded.
 Marshall Memorial Bridge built.
 1965 - Fort Lauderdale Pictorial Life magazine begins publication.
 1967 - Parker Playhouse opens.
 1970 - Population: 139,122.
 1971 - Regional Broward County Transit formed.
 1972 - Broward County Historical Commission founded.
 1974 - Broward County Library System established.
 1977
 Snowfall occurs.
 Genealogical Society of Broward County chartered.
 1983 - Municipal jail begins operating.
 1989 - Regional Tri-Rail begins operating.
 1991 - Broward Center for the Performing Arts opens.
 1992 - August: Hurricane Andrew occurs.
 1998 - City website online (approximate date).
 1999 - Broward County Central Homeless Assistance Center opens.
 2000
 Nutrition Center opens.
 Fort Lauderdale Antique Car Museum active.

21st century

 2003 - Fort Lauderdale Fire and Safety Museum founded.
 2009 - Jack Seiler becomes mayor.
 2010 - Population: 165,521.
 2014
 Higher-speed rail Fort Lauderdale station (Brightline) construction begins.
 Mormon temple built.
 2017
 January 6: Fort Lauderdale airport shooting occurs.
 Ted Deutch becomes U.S. representative for Florida's 22nd congressional district.

See also
 History of Fort Lauderdale, Florida
 List of mayors of Fort Lauderdale, Florida
 National Register of Historic Places listings in Broward County, Florida
 Timelines of other cities in the South Florida area of Florida: Boca Raton, Hialeah, Hollywood, Miami, Miami Beach, West Palm Beach

References

Bibliography

 
 1918 ed.
 
 Philip J. Weidling and August Burghard. Checkered Sunshine: The Story of Fort Lauderdale, 1793-1955 (Gainesville: University of Florida Press, 1966)

External links

 
 
 
 Items related to Fort Lauderdale, Florida, various dates (via Digital Public Library of America)

History of Fort Lauderdale, Florida
Fort Lauderdale